The Farewell Sermon (Khuṭbatu l-Widāʿ ) also known as  Muhammad's Final Sermon or the Last Sermon, is a religious speech, delivered by the Islamic prophet Muhammad on Friday the 9th of Dhu al-Hijjah, 10 AH (6 March 632) in the Uranah valley of Mount Arafat, during the Islamic pilgrimage of Hajj.
Muhammad al-Bukhari refers to the sermon and quotes part of it in his Sahih al-Bukhari. Part of it is also present in Sahih Muslim and Sunan Abu Dawood. Verse , "Today I have perfected for you your religion ...", is believed to have been recited during the address as the capstone verse of the Quran.
Various versions of the sermon have been published, including several English translations. The sermon consists of a series of general exhortations for Muslims to follow the teachings that Muhammad had set forth in the Quran and sunnah.

Narrations in hadith literature

In a lengthy hadith included in the Sahih Muslim, Sunan Abi Dawood, and Sunan Ibn Majah, Jabir ibn Abd Allah narrated details of Muhammad's pilgrimage and reported the following words of his sermon:

Sahih Muslim   Book 15, Hadith 159

Sunan al-Tirmidhi   Vol. 1, Book 7, Hadith 1163

Sunan ibn Maja   Vol. 3, Book 9, Hadith 1851

Report by historian Ibn Ishaq
An account of the sermon was collected by the early historian Ibn Ishaq, as quoted in Ibn Hisham's Sirah an-Nabawiyah and at-Tabari's Tarikh, with minor differences. The narration is translated by I. K. Poonawala in The History of al-Tabari, vol. IX: The Last Years of the Prophet (1990), as follows:

The sermon is also translated by Alfred Guillaume in The Life of Muhammad: A Translation of Isḥāq's Sīrat Rasūl Allāh (1955), which is based on the work of Ibn Hisham. Poonawala does not differ much with Guillaume in regards to meaning, but notable differences are his translation of bi’l-ma‘rūf as "with custom" and ‘awān as "domestic animals," whereas Guillaume translates the passage as, "If they refrain from these things they have the right to their food and clothing with kindness. Lay injunctions on women kindly, for they are prisoners with you having no control of their persons." Rizwi Faizer in her translation of al-Waqidi's Life of Muhammad rendered the same passage as, "Treat women well for they are bound to you and are dependent on you."

Ibn Ishaq also narrates the method in which the sermon was delivered:

Report by Al-Jahiz
Al-Jahiz in the Kitāb al-Bayān wa-al-Tabyīn presents the following text of the Farewell Sermon, also mentioned in Musnad of Imam Ahmad (hadith no.19774) as translated and annotated by Nuh Ha Mim Keller:

See also

 Verse of Ikmal al-Din
 Event of Ghadir Khumm
 Farewell Pilgrimage
 Muhammad in Islam

References

Life of Muhammad
Islamic sermons
7th-century speeches
632
Islamic terminology
Farewell addresses

si:අවසාන දේශනය